Multanaram Barupal is an Indian politician and former MLA constituency from Jaisalmer in Rajasthan. 
He has been chairman of Bar Association of Jaisalmer.

References

Living people
Rajasthan MLAs 1985–1990
People from Jaisalmer district
Year of birth missing (living people)